Ion Ion (born 21 June 1954) is a Romanian football manager and former player.

In his coaching career he has coached several clubs from Oman, Bahrain, UAE and Qatar.

He managed Steaua București for the 2017–18 season, but his contract was not renewed after the club failed to gain promotion to Liga III.

Honours

As a player 
Club

Steaua București
 Divizia A: 1975–76, 1977–78
 Cupa României: 1975–76
Rapid București
 Divizia B: 1982–83

As a manager 
Club

Steaua București
Liga IV Bucharest:
Runner-up: 2017-18

Notes

References

1954 births
Living people
Romanian footballers
Romanian football managers
Romanian expatriate football managers
FC Steaua București players
FC Rapid București players
CSM Jiul Petroșani managers
CSA Steaua București managers
Association football midfielders
Al-Muharraq SC managers
Fujairah FC managers